There Is a Secret In my Soup is a 2001 Hong Kong horror film directed by Yeung Chi Kin and based on the Hello Kitty murder.

Cast
Cherry Chan as Maggie
Chan Chung Wai
Christy Cheung
Co Co Chow
Gabriel Harrison as Joe
Benz Hui
Hugo Ng as Rocky
Angela Tong as Pat
Michael Wong
Timothy Zao

Reception
On BeyondHollywood.com, James Mudge said the film "is truly the dreg of the Category III genre. It’s a poorly made and boring mess that aims for both titillation and horror, but fails badly on both counts."

References

External links
 
 HK Cinemagic entry

2001 horror films
2000s crime films
Horror films based on actual events
Hong Kong horror films
2001 films
Hong Kong crime films
2000s Hong Kong films